The Aegidienkirche is a church dedicated to Saint Giles in the town of Heilbad Heiligenstadt, first built in 1227.

Sources
Homepage Pfarrgeminde St. Aegidien Heiligenstadt

Heilbad Heiligenstadt Aegidien